"Slough" is a ten-stanza poem by Sir John Betjeman, first published in his 1937 collection Continual Dew.

The British town of Slough was used as a dump for war surplus materials in the interwar years, and then abruptly became the home of 850 new factories just before World War II. The sudden appearance of this "Trading Estate", which was quickly widely reproduced throughout Britain, prompted the poem. Seeing the new appearance of the town, Betjeman was struck by the "menace of things to come". He later regretted the poem's harshness. The poem is not about Slough specifically, but about the desecration caused by industrialization and modernity in general, with the transformation of Slough being the epitome of these evils. Nevertheless, successive mayors of Slough have objected to the poem.

The poem was published two years before the outbreak of World War II, during which Britain (including Slough itself) experienced actual air raids. Much later, in a guide to English churches, Betjeman referred to some churches as "beyond the tentacles of Slough" and "dangerously near Slough". However, on the centenary of Betjeman's birth in 2006, his daughter apologised for the poem. Candida Lycett Green said her father "regretted having ever written it". During her visit, Lycett Green presented Mayor of Slough David MacIsaac with a book of her father's poems. In it was written: "We love Slough".

Responses 
In 2005, Ian McMillan published a poem titled "Slough Re-visited" using the same metre and rhyme-scheme as Betjeman's original, but celebrating Slough and rejecting mockery of the town as unfair.

Punk band Gallows, who originally formed in Slough, and whose singer Frank Carter has frequently expressed his dislike for the town in interviews, have several references to Betjeman's poem in their music: their album Orchestra of Wolves features a song entitled "Come Friendly Bombs", and an earlier song entitled "Swarm Over Death" (released on the band's 2005 demo) features the lyrics "Come friendly bombs/ And fall here now/ It isn't fit for humans now/ Swarm over death".

Morrissey used a similar theme in relation to the decline of British coastal resorts in his song "Everyday Is Like Sunday".

In the television series The Office, which is set in Slough, the character David Brent (portrayed by Ricky Gervais), reads extracts of the poem interjected with comments such as "You don't solve town planning problems by dropping bombs all over the place." The poem is reproduced in full on the liner of the video and DVD releases of the series.

References

External links

English poems
Slough Poem
1937 poems